The 1977–78 Czechoslovak Extraliga season was the 35th season of the Czechoslovak Extraliga, the top level of ice hockey in Czechoslovakia. 12 teams participated in the league, and Poldi SONP Kladno won the championship.

Regular season

1. Liga-Qualification 

 TJ Gottwaldov – Lokomotíva Bučina Zvolen 4:2 (3:5, 2:1, 0:3, 4:3, 5:2, 4:0)

External links
History of Czechoslovak ice hockey

Czechoslovak Extraliga seasons
Czech
1977–78 in Czechoslovak ice hockey